In Hoagland is an album by Georgie Fame, Annie Ross and Hoagy Carmichael, featuring a band of leading UK jazz musicians and arrangements by Harry South. Originally released under the title In Hoagland '81, it was recorded in London and released in June 1981, just a few months before Carmichael died in December of that year.

Track listing 
All tracks composed by Hoagy Carmichael; except where indicated
"The Old Music Master" (Carmichael, Johnny Mercer)
"Hong Kong Blues"
"Georgia on My Mind" (Carmichael, Stuart Gorrell)
"One Morning in May"
"My Resistance Is Low" (Carmichael, Harold Adamson)
I Get Along Without You Very Well"
"Rockin' Chair"
"Drip Drop" 
"Stardust" (Carmichael, Mitchell Parish)
"Up a Lazy River" (Carmichael, Sidney Arodin)
"Two Sleepy People" (Carmichael, Frank Loesser)	
"Hoagy's Help" (Spoken) 	
"Hoagland"

Personnel 
Georgie Fame - keyboards, vocals, producer, arranger
Annie Ross – vocals
Hoagy Carmichael - piano, vocals
Harry South – arranger
Barry Morgan - drums
Chris Pyne - trombone
Daryl Runswick - bass
Dick Morrissey - tenor saxophone, flute
Jim Richardson - bass
Geoff Castle - synthesizer, keyboards
Ian Hamer - trumpet
Martin Kershaw - guitar
Peter King - alto saxophone 
Technical
Steve Short, Dai Reynolds, Terry Evennett - engineer

References 

1981 albums
Georgie Fame albums
Albums arranged by Harry South
Albums recorded at Trident Studios
Jazz albums by British artists